Devrim Evin (born November 12, 1978) is a Turkish actor.

Filmography

References

External links

1978 births
Turkish male film actors
Living people